Monika Bergmann-Schmuderer (born 17 April 1978 in Lam) is a retired German alpine skier.

She represented Germany at the 1998, 2002 and 2006 Winter Olympics. She also won a gold medal in team competition at FIS Alpine World Ski Championships 2005. In the World Cup she has 6 podiums.

External links 
 
 
 
 

1978 births
Living people
German female alpine skiers
Alpine skiers at the 1998 Winter Olympics
Alpine skiers at the 2002 Winter Olympics
Alpine skiers at the 2006 Winter Olympics
Olympic alpine skiers of Germany
21st-century German women